Port Shepstone is a large town situated on the mouth of the Mzimkhulu River, the largest river on the KwaZulu-Natal South Coast of South Africa. It is located halfway between Hibberdene and Margate and is positioned 120 km south of Durban. It is the administrative, educational and commercial centre for southern Natal.

History 
Port Shepstone was founded in 1867 when marble was discovered near the Mzimkhulu River mouth and is named after Sir Theophilus Shepstone of the Natal government of the 1880s.

William Bazley began building a harbour, and the work was later taken over by William Barnes Kinsey, who was the engineer in charge of building Port Shepstone harbour in 1898. The first coaster entered the harbour on May 8, 1880. In 1882 a party of 246 Norwegian immigrants settled in the town and subsequently started to play a major role in the development of the area. Post the opening of the railway to Durban in 1901, the harbour fell into disuse and eventually the river silted up again, making it impossible to use. The 27,000-candela lighthouse still stands at the mouth of the Mzimkulu River.

Norwegian settlers
Norwegian immigration to Port Shepstone began in the late 19th century, when 246 Norwegians (along with 175 Briton and 112 German settlers) came ashore with a steamship which arrived in 1882. The soon-to-be settlers founded a nearby interior village within the same year, known as Marburg. The Norwegian settlers played a large role in the development of not only Marburg, but also Port Shepstone and nearby areas. Norwegian immigration to the region was a result of the Natal Immigration Board’s efforts to claim land for Europeans in South Africa. When the Norwegians first arrived, they were the largest European group in Alfred County. Remains of the Norwegian presence can still be seen today in certain places of the town, such as, Fredheim and Oslo Beach, with its main street King Haakon Drive.

The Norwegians erected a Norwegian Lutheran church, school, cultural hall, choir, and rowing club. A newspaper in Norwegian language was also distributed in Port Shepstone. Drinks such as akvavit and cuisine, including cheese from soured milk, were easily accessible. When the Norwegians arrived, few European settlers lived in the area and the town of Port Shepstone consisted of one hotel, two cabins, one shop, and little else.

After Norwegian settlement

Port Shepstone was declared “a full fiscal port’ in 1893, and after Durban officially became the region’s second harbour. Eventually, though, the ongoing wreckages and arrival of the railway, was to see the gradual closure of the harbour and the start of the real Port Shepstone boom.

When the railroad arrived in Port Shepstone in 1901, the travel time to Durban was reduced to five hours, and the town became far less isolated. The railway connection opened for increased immigration for other settlers, and the Norwegians were soon outnumbered by German and British settlers. Between 1911 and 1912, the number of students at the Norwegian school became too low for the school to keep open, and it consequentially closed.

Apartheid era 
In 1950, the Group Areas Act. racially divided Port Shepstone similar to many other towns and cities in South Africa. Port Shepstone proper (Sheppie) was classified "white" and was managed by its town board. The "white" suburbs of the town included the little coastal villages of Umtentweni, Sea Park, Southport, Anerley and Sunwich Port to the north and Oslo Beach to the south. To the west, Marburg was classified as an "Indian area" which was one of the four Indian proclaimed townships in the KwaZulu-Natal province and Merlewood was classified as a "Coloured area" with 3000 Coloureds as its first people settling there. In the late 1960s, Albersville, just west of the CBD was classified as an "Indian area".

The N2 highway that cuts through Port Shepstone acted as a border between the "non-white" areas to the west and the "white" areas to the east (excluding Albersville) which was planned by apartheid planners.

At the time, there was no township present in Port Shepstone due to the management of the "black" area which was creating a problem because the Nsimbini Tribal Authority claimed the extension of their territory on white land which was their in the past. The Grand Apartheid policies initiated in the 60’s is going to include the two “villages” of Boboyi and Murchison in the KwaZulu bantustan.

Notable People 
 Roland Victor Norris (1888–1950), biochemist, died in Shepstone
 Theophilus Shepstone (1817–1893), statesman

Administration and Public Services 

Port Shepstone is governed by the Ray Nkonyeni Local Municipality, which is part of the larger Ugu District Municipality. Not only does Port Shepstone serve the role and function of the main economic hub for the KZN South Coast, but it is also the administrative seat for both the  Ugu District Municipality and Ray Nkonyeni Local Municipality including the municipal administrative offices and the council chambers of both municipalities. Port Shepstone also has a Magistrates court serving the South Coast's justice cluster and regional branches for the Department of Home Affairs, South African Social Security Agency (SASSA), Small Enterprise Development Agency (SEDA) and the South African Revenue Service (SARS).

Geography 
Port Shepstone's topography is characterised by a rugged/hilly terrain with the Central Business District (CBD) lying on a large hill overlooking the Indian Ocean. Port Shepstone proper (excluding its extensions) is bordered by the uMzimkhulu River to the north and the N2 freeway to the east and is also bordered by its extensions of Umtentweni to the north, Oslo Beach to the south and Marburg to the west.

Port Shepstone has strong economic ties with the villages that lie north of it from Umtentweni to Sunwich Port (and to an extent, Melville), the western suburbs of Marburg and Merlewood and Oslo Beach, to the south. Due to these smaller settlements' strong links to the town, today they administratively fall under Port Shepstone and have become suburbs/extensions of the town.

Communities

 Albersville
 Anerley
 Bomela
 Broadview Estate
 Grosvenor
 Lion's Grove
 Louisiana
 Merlewood
 Marburg
 Mzimakwe
 Oslo Beach
 Sea Park
 Southport
 Sunwich Port
 Umbango
Umtentweni

Climate

Economy

Economic role 
Port Shepstone with its suburbs/extensions, Boboyi, Murchison, other surrounding rural areas and Oribi Flats (includes the farms surrounding Oribi Gorge) all form the functional area of the town. Being the administrative and economic hub of the South Coast, it is quite difficult for Port Shepstone to depict its industrial character in the network of surrounding coastal resort villages and towns such as Shelly Beach, Margate, Ramsgate, Port Edward and Hibberdene amongst others. However Port Shepstone is still able to manage the necessary administrative, political and magisterial aspects of the Hibiscus Coast and the greater South Coast and still remains the primary area of potential jobs for the surrounding rural areas and the nearby township of Gamalakhe.

Manufacturing and industries 
The manufacturing hub in the KwaZulu-Natal South Coast is mainly centered around Port Shepstone, especially around its western suburb of Marburg which is the KZN South Coast's main industrial hub.

The town's industries also include Illovo Sugar's Umzimkhulu Sugar Mill, a lime works and a marble quarry. Additionally, timber, wattle bark and sub-tropical fruit are produced in the district.

Retail 
Port Shepstone is one of the largest retail nodes on the KwaZulu-Natal South Coast with a large concentration of shopping centres and other retail facilities. The town has four shopping centres (excluding those of Greater Port Shepstone) and include:

 Bargain City Centre is a small shopping centre consisting of mainly clothing stores and is located on the corner between Wooley Street and Nelson Mandela Drive in the CBD.
 Ithala Centre Port Shepstone is a small shopping centre which has Superspar as its anchor tenant is located between Bazley, Dennis Shepstone and Ryder streets in the CBD.
 Oribi Plaza, the largest shopping centre in Port Shepstone which has PicknPay as its anchor tenant is located above the CBD, on the R102.
 Sheppie Mall is a small shopping centre which has Spar as its anchor tenant is located in the well-known 'Dip' site on Port Shepstone's main street, Aiken Street in the CBD. 

The remainder and the bulk of its retail sector is based on the string of retail stores and services on the streets of the CBD. In addition, nearby and larger shopping centers include Southcoast Mall and Shelly Centre, both located in the nearby coastal town of Shelly Beach.

Culture and contemporary life

Tourism 
Port Shepstone is not only an economic hub in the South Coast but is also a tourist hub.

Attractions include the Mzimkhulu River Marina, which has leisure boat trips on the river in which people can admire the rich wildlife and bird life along the banks of the river.

Other attractions include the Port Shepstone Museum; the museum includes the town's history with a series of exhibits carrying a maritime theme; the Port Shepstone Lighthouse, which has a 27 000 candela lighthouse that still stands at the mouth of the Mzimkhulu River. The present day cast iron lighthouse was erected during 1906 and can still be explored today.

Attractions in the broader area (KZN South Coast) include the Oribi Gorge 21 km west of Port Shepstone, Aliwal Shoal, Umtanvuma Nature Reserve, Pure Venom Reptile Farm and the Riverbend Crocodile Farm among others.

Beaches in the greater Port Shepstone area include Anerley, Banana Beach, Melville, Oslo Beach, Port Shepstone (main beach), Sea Park, Southport, Sunwich Port and Umtentweni.

Sports
The Port Shepstone Country Club is located on the northern banks of the Mzimkhulu River opposite the CBD in Umtentweni. Other golf courses in the broader area are in Margate, Southbroom, Port Edward, Hibberdene, Pennington and Scottburgh.

Education
The first school was opened in 1883, but by 1950, the school became too small. The Port Shepstone School split into two, the Port Shepstone Primary School and the Port Shepstone High School. There is also the Port Shepstone Secondary School. There are other schools in the surrounding areas such as Mlonde High School, Marburg Secondary School, Marburg Primary School, R.A Engar Primary School, Jai Hind Primary School, Margate Middle School, Margate Primary, Ingwemabala Comprehensive High School, Makhanda Secondary School and Insingizi Combined Primary School

Media
Local newspapers in Port Shepstone include the South Coast Herald and South Coast Fever which serve the entirety of the KwaZulu-Natal South Coast.

The Ugu Youth Radio is a youth radio which is based in Port Shepstone and caters to the needs of the Zulu-speaking community. Other radios which serve Port Shepstone and surroundings include East Coast Radio, Gagasi FM, Vuma FM and Ukhozi FM, all of which are based either to the North of KwaZulu-Natal or central Durban.

Infrastructure

Transportation

Air
The nearest airport is Margate Airport, which is located in the namesake town and is about 20 km south-west of Port Shepstone. The airport is small-scale, and only offers one scheduled domestic route to Johannesburg. King Shaka International Airport, near Durban, is about 158 km north-east of Port Shepstone and has many domestic and international air routes.

Buses
Bus companies that operate long-distance routes to and from Port Shepstone include Intercape, Intercity, Greyhound and Citiliner. These buses normally terminate around the Central Business District (CBD) near Port Shepstone High School, Shell petrol station or opposite Oribi Plaza Shopping Centre.

Rail
Port Shepstone railway station opened in 1917, serving as both the southern terminus of the Cape gauge line from & to Durban, as well as the southern coastal terminus of the narrow gauge Alfred County Railway to Harding.

After the standard gauge Transnet passenger services shut down in 1986, the ACR continued operations until 2005, when the famous Banana Express ceased operation.

Road

The N2 highway from Durban has two off ramps in Port Shepstone, exit 45 and exit 51.

The Oribi Toll Plaza (which forms part of the N2 South Coast Toll Road) is located at exit 45. Before 2021, the N2 coming from Durban diverged at exit 45 westwards towards Harding and Kokstad, while the R61 continued south as the tolled highway towards Margate and Port Edward, completing the last leg of the South Coast Toll Route. Now, there is currently construction of the N2 Wild Coast Toll Route, which will effectively re-designate the highway heading south from Exit 45 past Port Edward as the N2 (it will no-longer be designated as the R61) once the new route is complete. Also, the road from Exit 45 westwards past Kokstad will effectively be re-designated as the R102 (it will no-longer be designated as the N2).

Exit 51 is located north of Port Shepstone in Umtentweni and the road at the off-ramp connects to Umtentweni and St Faith's.

An alternative route to the South Coast Toll Route is to either take the R102 if heading north towards Durban or south towards Port Shepstone and the R620 heading south towards Margate and Southbroom and north towards Port Shepstone.

The R102 (Harding Road) which is the original N2 and served the same function before the construction of the highway is a regional route which begins at the intersection with the N2 in Marburg, bypasses the CBD to the east and crosses over the uMzimkhulu River to Umtentweni, Melville and Hibberdene. The R102 can be used an alternative route to Durban (via N2 near Hibberdene) for motorists avoiding the Oribi Toll Plaza. 

The R620 (Marine Drive) which begins at the intersection with the R102 in Oslo Beach, south of Port Shepstone links the town to Shelly Beach, St Michaels-on-sea, Uvongo, Margate, Ramsgate and Southbroom. The R620 can be used an alternative route to Shelly Beach, for motorists avoiding the Izotsha Ramp Plaza on the R61/N2 highway and Port Edward, for motorists coming from Durban (via the R61 in Southbroom) and wanting to avoid the Oribi Toll Plaza.

The 'Main Harding Road'/'Nelson Mandela Drive' which was part of original N2 (before the R102) before the construction of the highway is a secondary route for Port Shepstone linking the N2 in Marburg directly to the CBD without having to go through the R102.

Healthcare
Port Shepstone has two hospitals, Port Shepstone Regional Hospital, the only in public hospital in the town and the largest on the South Coast and the Hibiscus Hospital Port Shepstone (previously and popularly known as 'Hibiscus Private Hospital'), the only private hospital in the town, both of which are located in Port Shepstone's CBD. Port Shepstone also has three public clinics in its greater area including the Port Shepstone Clinic, Marburg Clinic and Umtentweni Clinic.

Arms

References

Populated places in the Ray Nkonyeni Local Municipality
Populated coastal places in South Africa
KwaZulu-Natal South Coast